The eighth season of the American television comedy The Office commenced airing on NBC in the United States on September 22, 2011, and concluded on May 10, 2012, consisting of 24 episodes. The series is an American adaptation of the British comedy series of the same name, and is presented in a mockumentary format, portraying the daily lives of office employees in the Scranton, Pennsylvania branch of the fictitious Dunder Mifflin Paper Company. The eighth season of The Office aired on Thursdays at 9:00 p.m. (Eastern) in the United States as part of the "Comedy Night Done Right" television block. It stars Rainn Wilson, John Krasinski, Jenna Fischer, B. J. Novak, Ed Helms, and James Spader, with supporting performances from Catherine Tate, Leslie David Baker, Brian Baumgartner, Creed Bratton, Kate Flannery, Mindy Kaling, Ellie Kemper, Angela Kinsey, Paul Lieberstein, Oscar Nunez, Craig Robinson, Phyllis Smith, and Zach Woods. This was the first season without Steve Carell as Michael Scott in the lead role and the only one to not feature the character in any onscreen capacity, although he is occasionally mentioned.

The eighth season largely centers on Andy Bernard's (Ed Helms) ascension to regional manager, as well as the antics of Robert California (James Spader), the new CEO of Sabre, a fictional printer company that owns Dunder Mifflin. Halfway through the season, Dwight Schrute (Rainn Wilson)—along with Jim Halpert (John Krasinski), Stanley Hudson (Leslie David Baker), Ryan Howard (B. J. Novak), Erin Hannon (Ellie Kemper), and Cathy Simms (Lindsey Broad)—travel to Florida to help set up a Sabre Store, where Nellie Bertram (Catherine Tate) is introduced. Eventually, former CFO of Dunder Mifflin David Wallace (Andy Buckley) buys back the company, firing California.

Despite debuting with moderate viewing figures, the departure of Carell affected the show's ratings, which fell as the season progressed. The season ranked as the eighty-seventh-most watched television series during the 2011–12 television year and saw a dramatic decrease in ratings from the previous season. Critical reception was polarized. Many critics argued that the series should have ended after the departure of Carell; many also felt that the season recycled storylines from past episodes. Other critics were more positive, complimenting various actors and their characters. It marked the first time since season one that the show did not receive any Emmy nominations.

Production
The eighth season of the show was produced by Reveille Productions and Deedle-Dee Productions, both in association with Universal Television. The show is based on the British comedy series of the same name, which was created by Ricky Gervais and Stephen Merchant for the British Broadcasting Corporation (BBC). In addition, the two are executive producers on the show. This season of The Office was produced by Greg Daniels and Paul Lieberstein, the latter of whom serves as the showrunner. Returning writers from the previous season included Lieberstein, Charlie Grandy, Justin Spitzer, Carrie Kemper, Daniel Chun, Robert Padnick, Aaron Shure, Steve Hely, Amelie Gillette, Mindy Kaling, and B. J. Novak; the latter two were both also credited as executive producers. It was previously unknown whether Kaling would write for the series any longer. Kaling herself confirmed via her Twitter page that she would write the Christmas-themed episode, "Christmas Wishes". Three new writers joined the staff beginning in season eight: Owen Ellickson, Allison Silverman and Dan Greaney. The season also saw the directorial debuts of cast members Ed Helms and Brian Baumgartner; Helms directed the episode "Christmas Wishes", and Baumgartner directed "After Hours".

The series was renewed for an eighth season on March 17, 2011, began filming on July 25, 2011, and the season concluded filming on March 9, 2012. Jenna Fischer's pregnancy was written into the show, and Pam was again pregnant at the start of the season with a boy as she was in real life. Unlike the sixth season, there was no episode focusing on the baby's birth; it was instead announced on a blog. In an interview, executive producer Lieberstein stated that, with the departure of Michael Scott, the writers would explore further into the other characters on the show, such as centering on a specific character for an episode. On January 25, 2012, news broke that NBC was planning a spin-off series starring Rainn Wilson as Dwight Schrute, that would be set at Schrute Farms, Dwight's bed-and-breakfast and beet farm. The spin-off would be created by Wilson and executive producer Paul Lieberstein, but Office developer Greg Daniels would not be involved. Due to his initial involvement in the spin-off, Lieberstein stepped down as showrunner of The Office. On October 29, 2012, it was revealed that NBC was not going forward with the proposed spin-off, although the original backdoor pilot, "The Farm" aired later in the ninth season.

Casting
Cody Horn, who guest-starred in the seventh season as Jordan Garfield, was originally supposed to be featured as a recurring character this season, but she did not return. The eighth season introduced several new characters. Stephen Collins, Dee Wallace and Josh Groban were cast as Andy's father, mother and brother, respectively, and appeared in the episode "Garden Party". From the episodes "Pam's Replacement" to "Last Day in Florida", Lindsey Broad had a recurring guest-star spot as Cathy Simms, Pam's temporary replacement while she was on maternity leave, and who remained employed at the company for a while after. Maura Tierney appeared in "Mrs. California", playing California's wife. Catherine Tate returned to reprise her role as Nellie Bertram, in a major arc starting in the episode "Tallahassee". Despite reports that she would also get romantically involved with Robert, this never occurred. Two writers for the animated comedy series The Simpsons, Matt Selman and Matt Warburton, appeared in the Kaling-scripted episode "Test the Store", and Simpsons star Dan Castellaneta appeared in the episode "Turf War". While, it was initially announced that the season would introduce Stanley Hudson's "other daughter and a new male addition to the accounting department", these new characters never appeared.

At the time, this season marked the final year that some cast members—notably Helms, Fischer, Novak, and Krasinski—were signed on for the show, as their contracts expired at the end of the season; this caused speculation that several members of the main cast would leave the series following this season. The eighth season was Novak's last as a series regular, although he made a couple of recurring appearances in the ninth season. It was also Kaling's final full season, due to her pilot, The Mindy Project, being picked up by Fox; Kaling portrayed customer service representative Kelly Kapoor. On February 28, 2012, it was announced that Spader would not return for a ninth season of the show. There was initial speculation that following the eighth season, Daniels was considering rebooting the series due to the possible departures of main cast members. However, a new deal was negotiated with NBC, and all the main cast members, sans Spader, Novak, and Kaling, would return for the ninth season, although several new characters would be brought on board for a "mini reboot". NBC also announced that Catherine Tate would become a series regular.

Cast

The Office employs an ensemble cast. Most of the main characters, and some supporting ones, are based on characters from the British version of The Office. While these characters normally have the same attitudes and perceptions as their British counterparts, the roles have been redesigned to better fit the American show. The show is known for its large cast size, many of whom are known particularly for their improvisational work.

Main
 Rainn Wilson as Dwight Schrute, based upon Gareth Keenan, who is the office's top-performing sales representative. 
 John Krasinski as Jim Halpert, a sales representative and prankster, who is based upon Tim Canterbury, and is married to Pam Halpert, the office administrator. 
 Jenna Fischer as Pam Halpert, who is based on Dawn Tinsley, is shy, but is often a cohort with Jim in his pranks on Dwight. She is pregnant during the first episodes of the season and leaves midway through the season.  
 B. J. Novak as Ryan Howard, a temporary worker, who is based on Ricky Howard and Neil Godwin. 
 Ed Helms as Andy Bernard, the newly-promoted manager—who was previously a salesman—and boastful Cornell alumnus whose love for a cappella music and awkward social skills generates mixed feelings from his employees. Andy is an original character, meaning he has no English equivalent from Gervais's series. 
 James Spader as Robert California, the eccentric CEO of Sabre. Spader reprises his guest-starring role from the seventh season, and joined the regular cast to replace Kathy Bates's character.

Starring
 Catherine Tate as Nellie Bertram, the president of Sabre's special projects, who later usurps Andy's role as regional manager.
 Leslie David Baker as Stanley Hudson, a grumpy salesman.
 Brian Baumgartner as Kevin Malone, a dim-witted accountant, who is based on Keith Bishop.
 Creed Bratton as Creed Bratton, the office's strange quality assurance officer.
 Kate Flannery as Meredith Palmer, the promiscuous supplier relations representative.
 Mindy Kaling as Kelly Kapoor, the pop-culture obsessed customer service representative.
 Ellie Kemper as Erin Hannon, the receptionist and love interest of Andy.
 Angela Kinsey as Angela Martin, a judgemental accountant.
 Paul Lieberstein as Toby Flenderson, the sad-eyed human resources representative.
 Oscar Nunez as Oscar Martinez, an intelligent accountant, who is also gay.
 Craig Robinson as Darryl Philbin, the warehouse supervisor.
 Phyllis Smith as Phyllis Vance, a motherly saleswoman.
 Zach Woods as Gabe Lewis, the director of Sabre sales.

Recurring
 Mark Proksch as Nate Nickerson, a warehouse worker.
 Ameenah Kaplan as Val Johnson, a warehouse worker and Darryl's love interest.
 Hugh Dane as Hank Tate, the building's security guard.
 Lindsey Broad as Cathy Simms, a temporary worker.
 Eleanor Seigler as Jessica, Andy’s girlfriend.
 Jack Coleman as Robert Lipton, a state senator and Angela's husband.
 David Koechner as Todd Packer, a rude and offensive employee, now working in Florida after Dwight and Jim tried to get him fired.
 Georgia Engel as Irene, an old woman from Florida.
 Andy Buckley as David Wallace, the former CFO of Dunder Mifflin.

Notable guests
 Stephen Collins as Walter Bernard Sr., Andy’s father.
 Josh Groban as Walter Bernard Jr., Andy’s brother.
 Dee Wallace as Ellen Bernard, Andy’s mother.
 Maura Tierney as Susan California, Robert’s wife.
 Brett Gelman as an unnamed magician that Pam hires for Nellie’s welcome party.
 Sendhil Ramamurthy as Ravi, a pediatric surgeon and Kelly’s new boyfriend.
 Chris Bauer as Harry Jannerone, a salesman from the Syracuse, New York branch.
 Dan Castellaneta as Mr. Ramish, the CEO of Prestige Direct.

Reception

Ratings

The series aired on Thursdays at 9:00 p.m. as part of "Comedy Night Done Right" television block. The season premiere, "The List" received a 3.9/10 percent share in the Nielsen ratings among viewers aged 18 to 49, meaning that 3.9 percent of viewers aged 18 to 49 watched the episode, and 10 percent of viewers watching television at the time watched the episode. "The List" was the highest-rated episode of the season. Despite this, it became the lowest-rated season premiere of the series since the series premiere. The rest of the season was unable to receive more than seven million viewers. The twenty-second episode, "Fundraiser" received only 4.17 million viewers, making it, at the time, the lowest-rated episode of The Office to ever air (although it was later beaten by several ninth-season episodes the following year). The season finale, "Free Family Portrait Studio", was viewed by 4.49 million viewers, making it the lowest finale for The Office to air, beating the first-season finale "Hot Girl", which was viewed by 4.8 million viewers. The drop in ratings led to a lower ad-price for the series, with an average cost of $178,840 per 30-second commercial. Despite this, the show was still one of NBC's highest-rated shows and ranked as the most expensive ad-cost for any NBC scripted series during the year it aired. Despite the lower live ratings, Nielsen Soundscan announced that The Office added up to 44 percent to its next-day "live plus same day" 18–49 rating when additional time-shifted viewing was added, such as DVRing.

The season ranked as the eighty-seventh-most watched television series during the 2011–12 season, with an average of 6.506 million viewers. The season also ranked as the thirty-second-most watched television series in the 18- to 49-year-old demographic. In this category, the show was viewed by an estimated 4.376 million viewers per episode and received a 3.42 rating/9 percent share among adults between the ages of 18 and 49. This means that, on average, the season was viewed by 3.42 percent of all 18- to 49-year-olds, and 9 percent of all 18- to 49-year-olds watching television at the time of the broadcast.

Critical response

The eighth season of The Office received mixed reviews. While some critics felt that the show was still humorous in its eighth year, many others argued that the program should have ended after the departure of Steve Carell. The A.V. Club reviewer Myles McNutt criticized Robert California's role, noting that he is a character that "the narrative reacts to as opposed to something actually involved in the narrative". Alan Sepinwall of HitFix criticized Ed Helms' comedic performance as manager (calling him "a softer version of Michael Scott"), as well as the toning down of Robert California from his appearance in the show's seventh season's finale, "Search Committee". Sepinwall also expressed disappointment that many of the supporting characters were seemingly transformed into mere caricatures of their former selves. He stopped reviewing a majority of the Season 8 episodes since "Pam's Replacement", due to his distaste for the series. Time writer James Poniewozik also criticized the choice of Andy as manager, instead arguing that Jim should have gotten the job so the series could have been more ensemble-oriented. New York named Andy Bernard one of the most annoying TV characters of 2011. Early during the season's airing, Matt Zoller Seitz of Salon wrote a review in which he called the post-Michael Scott era of The Office "warmer and more reflective". After the season finished airing, however, Seitz penned another review, writing: "Fact is, the show's first post-Steve Carell year has been a mess, at times bordering on a disaster". McNutt gave the season a "C" grade overall, writing that the season finale, "Free Family Portrait Studio" was "a disheartening conclusion to the show's worst season, offering little optimism to sustain our already dwindling enthusiasm over the summer months."

Bret Fetzer of Amazon.com wrote that "it's best to approach this season as if it were a completely new series". He felt that it is unfair to compare the quality of this season to that of past seasons because "the series' previous heights were so very high". However, he called the year "uneven", because episodes would range from putting "Andy into Michael Scott-ish situations" to "seek[ing] out new angles on the well-established web of interpersonal conflicts". This vacillation between extremes meant that the episodes "sometimes" work. Hank Stuever of The Washington Post named the series the tenth-best series of 2011, specifically praising the actors' ability in "Mrs. California" to deliver cringe humor without Carell. TV Guide named it an honorable mention on their list of the best TV shows of 2011. Price Peterson from TV.com called the series "still one of the best shows on TV" and argued that, while "Season 8 definitely wasn't the show's best", the season "sneaked in some genuinely great jokes, new characters, and affecting plotlines." Despite the lackluster reviews many of the episodes received, many critics praised Ellie Kemper's performance as Erin Hannon. McNutt noted that "regardless of how down I was on this or any other episode, Ellie Kemper really has been tremendous all season." In addition, Kemper's performance in the episodes "Spooked," "Christmas Wishes," "Pool Party," and "Special Project," in particular, were praised by critics.

In retrospect, many members of the cast and crew felt that the season was not the show's best. Rainn Wilson said that the season made some mistakes "creatively"; for instance, he argued that the chemistry between Spader and Helms was "a bit dark" and that the show should have gone for a "brighter and more energized" relationship. Brian Baumgartner felt that the show "stayed status quo [with the previous year], but without a key piece" and "didn't make a firm decision" on the direction it was headed. Ben Silverman, one of the show's producers, said that "it didn't have the sense of purpose and focus" that the next season would have.

Episodes

In the following table, "U.S. viewers (million)" refers to the number of Americans who viewed the episode on the night of broadcast. Episodes are listed by the order in which they aired, and may not necessarily correspond to their production codes.

Home media release

References

External links
 
 

 
2011 American television seasons
2012 American television seasons